Joseph Alexander Hernandez (born October 16, 1984) is a Cuban American boxer.

Professional boxing career

A southpaw, Hernandez turned professional on December 16, 2006, winning a four round decision over Eduardo Adorno at the Miccosukee Indian Gaming Resort in Miami, Florida. Hernandez won the vacant USBO light middleweight title on March 25, 2011, in River Grove, Illinois by disqualification in the eighth round of a scheduled twelve rounder when Angel Hernandez, his opponent, was disqualified after repeated fouling.

Personal life
Hernandez resides in Miami Beach, Florida.

References

External links
 
 Official website

1984 births
Living people
Sportspeople from Miami
American boxers of Cuban descent
American male boxers
Light-middleweight boxers